Thomas Worthington (July 16, 1773June 20, 1827) was an American politician who served as the sixth governor of Ohio.

Early life
Worthington was born in Berkeley County near Charles Town in the Colony of Virginia. In 1796, he married a Virginia woman, Eleanor Swearingen, who joined him in emigrating to Ross County, Ohio, where they emancipated their slaves. The home they eventually built just outside Chillicothe was called Adena and is the namesake of the Adena culture. The first of their ten children, daughter Mary, married David Macomb, a future leader of the Texas Revolution. Their first son, James, graduated from West Point, held the rank of Brigadier General in the Ohio Militia, and later fought in the Mexican-American and Civil Wars.

Career
He served in the Territorial House of Representatives from 1799 to 1803 and served as a Ross county delegate to the State Constitutional Convention in 1802. He was a leader of the Chillicothe Junto, a group of Chillicothe Democratic-Republican politicians who brought about the admission of Ohio as a state in 1803 and largely controlled its politics for some years thereafter. Among his colleagues in the faction were Nathaniel Massie and Edward Tiffin.

Worthington was elected one of Ohio's first Senators in 1803, serving until 1807. He was returned to the Senate in December 1810 upon the resignation of Return J. Meigs, Jr. and served until December 1814, when he resigned after winning election to the governorship. On June 17, 1812, he voted "No" on the resolution to declare war on Britain, but the vote in favor of war was 19 to 13. He won re-election as governor two years later, moving the state capital from Chillicothe to Columbus. Worthington did not seek re-election in 1818.

He platted what would become the city of Logan, Ohio in 1816.

In January 1819, when the election was held to replace the retiring Jeremiah Morrow in the Senate, he held the lead through the first three ballots, only losing when factions aligned behind William A. Trimble on the fourth and final ballot. He narrowly lost a bid for a partial term in the Senate in 1821, losing to the incumbent governor, Ethan Allen Brown, and so he instead returned to the Ohio House of Representatives.

After being the runner-up in the 1808 and 1810 gubernatorial elections, he won the 1814 and 1816 elections by landslide margins. Both times he nearly reached three-quarters of the vote. After two terms he stepped down as governor.

Death
Worthington was initially buried at his estate in Adena, and was later interred at Grandview Cemetery, Chillicothe, Ross County, Ohio.

Legacy
Worthington is a member of the Ohio Hall Of Fame. The city of Worthington, Ohio, was named in Worthington's honor, as was Thomas Worthington High School.

Worthington is known as the "Father of the Ohio statehood".

References

Sources

 A New Nation Votes: American Election Returns, 1787–1825
Sears, Alfred Byron, Thomas Worthington, father of Ohio statehood, Ohio State University Press for the Ohio Historical Society, Columbus, OH [1958]   Full text here

External links

Ohio Memory
Adena Mansion & Gardens
The Public Career of Thomas Worthington, Doctoral Dissertation, Ohio State University, 1932

1773 births
1827 deaths
Governors of Ohio
Members of the Ohio House of Representatives
Northwest Territory officials
United States senators from Ohio
Politicians from Chillicothe, Ohio
Ohio Democratic-Republicans
Ohio Constitutional Convention (1802)
American surveyors
People from Charles Town, West Virginia
Democratic-Republican Party United States senators
Northwest Territory House of Representatives
Burials at Grandview Cemetery (Chillicothe, Ohio)
Democratic-Republican Party state governors of the United States
19th-century American politicians